Délegyháza is a village in Pest county, Budapest metropolitan area, Hungary. It has a population of 2,930 (2007).

Since 2008 the village is the site of a Trail of the Whispering Giants sculpture, the first of Peter Wolf Toth's sculptures located in Europe.  It is located along the Danube River.

References

Populated places in Pest County
Budapest metropolitan area